Giovanni Battista Laghi (born in 1665 in Venice) was an Italian clergyman and bishop for the Roman Catholic Archdiocese of Split-Makarska. He was appointed bishop in 1720. He died in 1730.

References 

1665 births
1730 deaths
Italian Roman Catholic bishops
Bishops of Split